The following lists events that happened during 2008 in Nepal.

Incumbents
President: Ram Baran Yadav (starting 23 July)
Prime Minister: Girija Prasad Koirala (starting 25 May and ending 18 August), Prachanda (starting 18 August)
Vice President: Parmanand Jha (starting 23 July)
Chief Justice: Kedar Prasad Giri

Events

May
 May 26 - Nepalese authorities ban rallies and mass meetings in Kathmandu prior to the first meeting of the Nepalese Constituent Assembly which is expected to declare Nepal a republic.
 May 28 - The Nepalese Constituent Assembly meets for the first time after the 2008 Nepalese Constituent Assembly election and votes to abolish the monarchy and establish a republic.

June

 June 11 - The last King of Nepal Gyanendra departs from Narayanhiti Palace for the last time after Nepal is declared to be a republic.

July
 July 21 - Nepal's presidential election concludes with Ram Baran Yadav winning with a majority.

August
 August 15 - The Nepalese Constituent Assembly elects former Maoist rebel Prachanda as the first Prime Minister of Nepal as a republic.

Deaths
Edmund Hillary - First person to reach top of Everest.

References

 
Nepal
2000s in Nepal
Years of the 21st century in Nepal
Nepal